The 2021–22 season was L.R. Vicenza's second consecutive season in second division of the Italian football league, the Serie B, and the 120th as a football club.

Players

First-team squad

Out on loan

Pre-season and friendlies

Competitions

Overall record

Serie A

League table

Results summary

Results by round

Matches
The league fixtures were announced on 24 July 2021.

Relegation play-out

Coppa Italia

References

L.R. Vicenza seasons
Vicenza